Froesia is a genus of plants in family Ochnaceae. Some authors have placed it in the Quiinaceae. It is known from Brazil, Peru, Colombia, Guyana and Venezuela.

The following species are accepted by The Plant List:

 Froesia crassiflora Pires & Fróes
 Froesia diffusa Gereau & R.Vásquez
 Froesia gereauana J.V.Schneid. & Zizka
 Froesia tricarpa Pires
 Froesia venezuelensis Steyerm. & Bunting

References

Ochnaceae